Casino Tycoon may refer to
Casino Tycoon (film), a 1992 film
Casino Tycoon (video game), a 2001 video game